Capwell is a surname. Notable people with the surname include:

George Capwell (1902–1970), American manager of the Empresa Eléctrica del Ecuador
Tobias Capwell (born ), American curator, military historian and jouster

Fictional characters
C.C. Capwell, a character on the American soap opera Santa Barbara
Gina DeMott Capwell  a character on the American soap opera Santa Barbara
Julia Wainwright Capwell, a character on the American soap opera Santa Barbara
Kelly Capwell, a character on the American soap opera Santa Barbara
Sophia Wayne Capwell a character on the American soap opera Santa Barbara
Ted Capwell, a character on the American soap opera Santa Barbara
Eden Capwell and Cruz Castillo, characters and a supercouple from the American daytime drama Santa Barbara
Pamela Capwell Conrad, a character on the American soap opera Santa Barbara

See also
Cork Capwell railway station, on the Cork and Macroom Direct Railway in County Cork, Ireland
Emporium Capwell, former mid-line department store chain headquartered in San Francisco, California
Estadio George Capwell, multi-purpose stadium in Guayaquil, Ecuador
Capel (disambiguation)
Capell
Capewell